is a 2009 Japanese/Australian action thriller film written and directed by Max Mannix. In the film a half-Japanese half-American hitman protects the daughter of one of his victims against the CIA. It was based on the novel Rain Fall by Barry Eisler.

Plot summary
In Tokyo, a minister of public works is rumored to be taking evidence of corruption to a reporter: the CIA, the yakuza, and others want to grab the information and use it to squeeze the government. On the subway trip to meet the reporter, the official is murdered, but it looks like a heart attack. However, no one, including the murderer, can find the flash drive with the evidence. Now the CIA, gangsters, and the city police are searching. The dead official's daughters are in danger: the shadowy John Rain, ex-special forces and perhaps now in league with North Korea, tries to stay one step ahead as he looks for the flash drive and protects one of the daughters.

Cast
 Kippei Shiina as John Rain
 Gary Oldman as William Holtzer

 Misa Shimizu as Yuko
 Kyōko Hasegawa as Midori
 Takumi Bando as Ken
 Akira Emoto as Tatsu
 Dirk Hunter as Thomas Perryman
 David McFall as CIA man

Reception

The overall reception of the film has been mixed to negative. M. Downing Roberts for the Midnight Eye review site said that "Fans of big-budget action will likely not be satisfied, but Rain Fall begins, albeit tentatively, to chart the territory for a different sort of thriller. In a future installment, one can hope that it might press further."

Another reviewer points out that "it might be a tough sell for North American audiences, as it boldly paints the United States government as an indescribably evil organization that will do whatever it takes to exploit a shaky political situation. And while this scenario posed no problems for me, I understand why Sony decided to produce the picture in Japan."

References

External links

2009 films
2009 action thriller films
Films based on American novels
Films scored by Kenji Kawai
Japan in non-Japanese culture
Japanese action thriller films